Carimi (often styled as CaRiMi) was a popular Haitian compas band assembled in New York City in 2001.

Biography

History
Carlo Vieux, Richard Cavé and Mikael Guirand who had worked together in some area of music, almost simultaneously made the decision to further their education. Acknowledging that the state of their homeland, Haiti, was troubled and unstable, they each decided to leave and set their sights on the United States. Always driven by their passion for music, this small group reunited in New York to touch upon making their current past-time a potential career.

They soon found themselves surrounded by sound proof foam mats, extended boom of mics and a mixing board. To their surprise, each had the same desire to pursue their music and created the name for their band by the taking the first two letters of their first names Carlo Vieux, Richard Cavé and Mikael Guirand; atlas, Carimi was born.

Hours and hours at the studio in the hopes of creating a new sound, one that was uncommon in the music industry at the time, the band found themselves putting on paper some profound, socially shared lyrics that encompassed the disorders of their native land. Haiti Bang, Bang, was released in the summer of 2001. Instantly, Carimi became a household name. They are known as one of the first younger generation digital bands to put out music that reflected upon the political pressures and the deteriorating security of Haiti. They had mass appeal to the Haitian diaspora who fled the country and through their allure lyrically, musically and of course sex appeal for the ladies, Carimi has thrived throughout the years.

In 2016 the singer Mickael Guirand decided to quit the band due to personal issues. The rest of the founding members decided to end their long journey and have gone on separate musical expeditions. In 2022 the band return for a 20th anniversary one day tour in Paris where they'll perform for the first time since the break up in 2016.

Members 
Current
Carlo Vieux – keyboard, lead vocals
Richard Cavé – keyboard, lead vocals
Mickael Guirand – lead vocals
Glenny Benoit – guitar
Dominick Sylvain – drums
Jean-Marie – congas
Noldy Cadet – bass
Marc C. Widmack – congas
Alex Thebaud – percussion, vocals
Jeffrey Raymond - bass

International stage
Carimi received accolades from the International music scene, including Best Album of the Year. Carimi has risen to the top of the charts across the billboards in Haiti, Guadeloupe, Paris, French Guiana, Canada and parts of Europe. They became the first Haitian band to come out with a kompa mobile app.

Discography
Bang Bang (2001)
Poze Aki (2002)
Nasty Biznis (2004)
Nasty Biznis: Live in Concert (2005)
Are U Ready? (2006)
Buzz (2009)
Invasion (2013)
Kite m' cho (2016)

References

External links

Haitian-American culture in New York City
Musical groups established in 2001
Haitian musical groups